"London's Burning" is a song by The Clash from their eponymous debut album. It is the eighth track in the U.K. version of this album, and the seventh track in the U.S. version, from 1979.

It is sung by Joe Strummer (and Mick Jones, with Paul Simonon in the chorus), who starts the song shouting "London's Burning!" two times. The song continues talking about London's automobile traffic, where young people try to get their kicks driving around in their cars through the night, feeling bored and far from happy. This message is clearly seen in the next verse:
"I'm up and down the Westway, in an' out the lights 
What a great traffic system – it's so bright 
I can't think of a better way to spend the night 
Than speeding around underneath the yellow lights"

The song alludes to the boredom of TV and may also reflect the racial theme often treated by the band, notably in the first verse with the line: "Black or white turn it on, face the new religion".

The song's name came from popular nursery rhyme about the Great Fire of London (1666).

It was first recorded at CBS Studios London for the sessions for the debut album. Mick Jones' improvised guitar solo at the end of the song is not very typical for punk rock, which often has a minimalist attitude. An alternative version taken from the "White Riot" promo film in April 1977 was released on the B-side of the controversial "Remote Control" single in May 1977.

Personnel
 Joe Strummer – lead vocals, lead guitar
 Mick Jones – backing vocals, lead guitar
 Paul Simonon – backing vocals, bass guitar
 Terry Chimes – drums

Cover versions
The song was covered on Puncolle – Voice Actresses' Legendary Punk Songs Collection.

The Clash songs
Songs written by Mick Jones (The Clash)
Songs written by Joe Strummer
1977 songs
Songs about London